George W. Wolfe (January 19, 1911 – July 20, 1993) was an American cartoonist. His comic strips Pops (1962–1978) and Citizen George (early 1970s) were syndicated by the Al Smith Feature Service. Wolfe received the National Cartoonist Society Gag Cartoon Award for 1969, 1973, 1975, and 1976 for his work. He spent most of his life in Glen Rock, New Jersey.

References

External links
NCS Awards
Glen Rock (NJ) Library Honors Late Cartoonist
Genealogy Bank

American cartoonists
American comics artists
1993 deaths
1911 births